Mark Janse (born 31 August 1959 in Sas van Gent, The Netherlands) is BOF-ZAP research professor in Asia Minor and Ancient Greek at Ghent University, where he studied Classics, Hebrew and Linguistics. Before coming to Ghent, Janse has been editor of Linguistic Bibliography (1982-2004) and Professor of Linguistics and Classics and Head of the Department of Arts & Humanities at University College Roosevelt, an international honours college of Utrecht University (2004-2008). He is a former visiting fellow of the University of Amsterdam (2002-2004), All Souls College in Oxford (2007 & 2014), the Onassis Foundation in Greece (2008 & 2013) and the Center for Hellenic Studies of Harvard University (2013-2014), a visiting professor at Ghent University (1996-2004), the University of Amsterdam (2003), Ohio State University (2004) and the University of Patras (2006-2009), and an Onassis Senior Visiting Scholar at Harvard University, the University of Arizona, Stanford University and Princeton University (2012). He is a Research Associate of the ESRC Centre for Research on Bilingualism at Bangor University (since 2008) and CHS Associate in Greek Linguistics of the Center for Hellenic Studies of Harvard University (since 2017).

Janse's fields of research are Asia Minor and Ancient Greek, language change, language typology, language contact, and language death, in both the ancient and the modern world, on which he has published numerous books and articles. In June 2005, Mark Janse and Dimitris Papazachariou from the University of Patras discovered native speakers of Cappadocian Greek, a Greek-Turkish mixed language believed to have died out in the 1960s. He is a corresponding member of the Centre for Asia Minor Studies (CAMS) in Athens and of the Centre for Cappadocian Studies (CCS) in nea Karvali, a member of the scientific board of the Pan-Hellenic Union of Cappadocian Societies (PEKS), an honorary member of the Cappadocian Society of Evros "The Three Bisshops" (Οι Τρεις Ιεράρχες), and a regularly invited speaker at the annual Cappadocian Gavoustema.

References

External links
UGent Research Portal
CHS webpage
PEKS webpage
Wikipedia article on Cappadocian
CAMS webpage
CCS webpage

1959 births
Living people
Linguists from the Netherlands
Academic staff of Ghent University
People from Sas van Gent
Ohio State University faculty
Academic staff of the University of Amsterdam
Academic staff of the University of Patras
Academic staff of Utrecht University